The 1955 West Texas State Buffaloes football team represented West Texas State College—now known as West Texas A&M University—as a member of the Border Conference during the 1955 college football season. Led by ninth-year head coach Frank Kimbrough, the Buffaloes  compiled an overall record of 4–4–1 with a mark of 1–4–1 in conference play, placing sixth the Border Conference.

Schedule

References

West Texas State
West Texas A&M Buffaloes football seasons
West Texas State Buffaloes football